Dirrhagofarsus is a genus of beetles belonging to the family Eucnemidae.

The species of this genus are found in Europe and Northern America.

Species:
 Dirrhagofarsus attenuatus (Mäklin, 1845)
 Dirrhagofarsus ernae Fleutiaux, 1935

References

Eucnemidae
Elateroidea genera